John Nicklaus Hoover (December 22, 1962 – July 8, 2014) was the Major League Baseball No. 25 draft choice in the first round in 1984 (by Baltimore), after having led the nation in strikeouts in college baseball, pitching 205 strikeouts for Fresno State in his senior year. Also in 1984 Hoover was a starting pitcher for the United States Olympic baseball team, winning the opening game and helping the US to win the silver medal for baseball. His teammates on the Olympic team included  Mark McGwire, Barry Larkin, Will Clark, and Oddibe McDowell.

In 1983, Hoover pitched the opening game at the IX Pan American Games, for an 8-0 victory over the Dominican Republic, helping to win the bronze medal for the United States team.

Hoover played for the Texas Rangers in the 1990 season, but had a shortened pro-baseball career due to injuries sustained as a college player. He died on July 8, 2014 apparently of natural causes. 

Prior to attending Fresno State, he attended Fresno High School, graduating in 1980 and Cooper Junior High School in Fresno, graduating in 1977.

References

External links

1962 births
2014 deaths
Texas Rangers players
Major League Baseball pitchers
Baseball players from California
Rochester Red Wings players
Charlotte O's players
Hagerstown Suns players
Miami Marlins (FSL) players
Jacksonville Expos players
Tulsa Drillers players
Oklahoma City 89ers players
Indianapolis Indians players
Fresno State Bulldogs baseball players
Baseball players at the 1984 Summer Olympics
Baseball players at the 1983 Pan American Games
Pan American Games medalists in baseball
Pan American Games bronze medalists for the United States
All-American college baseball players
Medalists at the 1983 Pan American Games
Anchorage Glacier Pilots players